A look at Nima Yoshij's poetry: A discussion on how poetic systems originated It is a book by Omid Tabibzadeh that deals with the place of Nima Yooshij in contemporary Iranian literature and the formation of new poetic systems.

References 

Works about Nima Yooshij